The 1951 Giro d'Italia was the 34th edition of the Giro d'Italia, one of cycling's Grand Tours. The Giro started off in Milan on 19 May with a  flat stage and concluded back in Milan with a  relatively flat mass-start stage on 10 June. Fourteen teams entered the race, which was won by Italian Fiorenzo Magni of the Ganna team. Second and third respectively were Belgian Rik Van Steenbergen and Swiss rider Ferdinand Kübler.

Teams

A total of 14 teams were invited to participate in the 1951 Giro d'Italia. Each team sent a squad of seven riders, so the Giro began with a peloton of 98 cyclists. Italy had the most participants with 80, the foreign participation included Belgium (9), Switzerland (5), and France (4). Out of the 98 riders that started this edition of the Giro d'Italia, a total of 75 riders made it to the finish in Milan.

The teams entering the race were:

  
  
  
  
Bianchi
 
 Fréjus
 
 Ganna
 Guerra
Legnano
 Stucchi

Pre-race favorites

It was widely believed that the competing field was very international than in years past at the Giro and it contained all the great cycling champions at the moment. Reigning champion Hugo Koblet (Guerra) entered the race to defend his crown. Koblet did not have a successful early season. Fausto Coppi and his Bianchi team were regarded as the strongest team. Coppi, who had broken his collarbone earlier in the 1951 season during the Milano–Torino, had recently shown his strength as he finished second overall at the Tour de Romandie. Nouelliste Valaisan wrote the even with Gino Bartali (Bartali) and Fiorenzo Magni's (Ganna) participation, that Coppi was the only hope for an Italian victory. Bartali was seen as a rider that could surprise, but not win the race. His most notable result was a second-place finish at La Flèche Wallonne. Magni was viewed as dangerous prospect; he won Milano–Torino and his third straight Tour of Flanders in April. As a whole, the "Big Three" of Italian cycling were seen as the only Italian riders with legitimate chances to win the title.

France's Louison Bobet (Bottecchia) was viewed as a strong candidate and in strong form. Bobet had placed third at the previous year's Tour de France, entered as the French national road race champion, and had won the Milan–San_Remo earlier that season. Swiss rider Fritz Schär (Arbos) was seen as a candidate to win the race as well. Frejus' Ferdinand Kübler, who won the 1950 Tour de France, participated as well with the hopes of winning the general classification. Kübler had a successful start to the 1951 campaign with victories at La Flèche Wallonne and Liège–Bastogne–Liège. Nouvelliste Valaisan speculated Kübler would not try to defend his Tour title in order to give the Giro his best effort. Coppi, Kubler, and Bobet were named among several media outlets to be the top contenders to win the race. The Girardengo team was viewed to be very strong, in part due to the fact the team possessed three riders with a history of winning the world championship men's road race: Marcel Kint (1938), Briek Schotte (1948 & 1950), and Rik Van Steenbergen (1949). Schotte finished second at the 1948 Tour de France (Bartali won the race overall).

Route and stages

The route was revealed on 5 February 1951. There were three rest days that divided the twenty stages. An alternate route through the Dolomites was created by the organizers in the chances that the Pordoi Pass, Passo Rolle, and the Falzarego Pass were not cross-able. The race did exit Italy to enter Switzerland.

There were some rule changes prior to the 1951 edition. Due to some complaints regarding Koblet's win the year prior, which some credited due to the time bonuses he had garnered from intermediate sprints, summits, and stage finishes, all time bonuses were removed from the race. In addition, the intermediate sprint classification was removed as a whole. Nouvelliste Valaisan felt the changes would make the cyclists lose interest. In addition, rules were changed regarding flat tires, riders would have to change the inner tube rather than change wheels.

The opening stages and the stages between the second and third rest days were thought to be easy, while the last four stages would be the hardest. A writer for Nouvelliste Valaisan felt the Giro had begun to open more to international riders, it has drawn the attention of the Tour de France organizers. At the time it was regarded as one of the top three stage races in the world, along with the Tour de France and the Tour de Suisse.

Classification leadership

The leader of the general classification – calculated by adding the stage finish times of each rider – wore a pink jersey. This classification is the most important of the race, and its winner is considered as the winner of the Giro.

Two additional jerseys were in use. The green jersey was given to the best foreign cyclist in the general classification; it was won by Belgian Rik Van Steenbergen. The white jersey was given to the best cyclist riding with a licence for independents; this was won by Arrigo Padovan.

In the mountains classification, the race organizers selected different mountains that the route crossed and awarded points to the riders who crossed them first. The winner of the team classification was determined by adding the finish times of the best three cyclists per team together and the team with the lowest total time was the winner. If a team had fewer than three riders finish, they were not eligible for the classification.

There was a black jersey (maglia nera) awarded to the rider placed last in the general classification. The classification was calculated in the same manner as the general classification.

The rows in the following table correspond to the jerseys awarded after that stage was run.

Final standings

General classification

Independent rider classification

Foreign rider classification

Mountains classification

Team classification

References

Citations

 
Giro d'Italia by year
Giro d'Italia
Giro d'Italia
Giro d'Italia
Giro d'Italia
Giro d'Italia